Shah Abd ol Azim (also Romanized as Shāh ‘Abd ol ‘Az̧īm) is a village in Shurab-e Tangazi Rural District, in the Central District of Kuhrang County, Chaharmahal and Bakhtiari Province, Iran. At the 2006 census, its population was 21, in 6 families.

References 

Populated places in Kuhrang County